Tai Kong Po is a village in Pat Heung, Yuen Long District, Hong Kong.

Administration
Tai Kong Po is a recognized village under the New Territories Small House Policy.

References

External links

 Delineation of area of existing village Lin Tai Kong Po Tsuen (Pat Heung) for election of resident representative (2019 to 2022)
 Antiquities Advisory Board. Historic Building Appraisal. Kong Ha Tin Lo, Nos. 198-199 Tai Kong Po, Kam Tin Pictures
 Webpage about Tai Kong Po

Villages in Yuen Long District, Hong Kong
Pat Heung